Alberto Nicolae Olaru (born 28 March 1998) is a Romanian professional footballer who last played as a right-back for Liga I club Petrolul Ploiești.

Club career
Olaru made his professional debut for his boyhood club Petrolul Ploiești on 24 October 2022, in a 2–0 Liga I win against FC Arges.

Honours
Petrolul Ploiești
Liga II: 2021–22

References

External links
Alberto Olaru at Liga Profesionistă de Fotbal 

1998 births
Living people
Sportspeople from Ploiești
Romanian footballers
Association football defenders
Liga I players
Liga II players
FC Petrolul Ploiești players